James Jimmy Life (born October 19, 1983 in Fort Myers, Florida) is an American professional basketball player, currently starring in the British Basketball League for the Worcester Wolves.

The 6'4" Shooting guard signed for Worcester in 2007, after graduating from the University of Massachusetts Amherst where he majored in Sociology. He earned a reputation while playing for the UMass Minutemen as a three-point specialist, in his senior year finishing fifth-best in single-season 3-pointers (With 87) in UMass history, whilst also being all-time sixth in career 3-pointers made (148) and 3-point field goal attempts at 425. Life’s ability to shoot from anywhere on the court would lead to all deep 3-pointers being dubbed “from Life Range”.

He has represented the Puerto Rico national team, as his mother is Puerto Rican. He played at 2010 Centrobasket and the 2010 Central American and Caribbean Games.

References

External links
Profile on UMass Athletics' website
James Life at latinbasket.com

1983 births
Living people
American expatriate basketball people in Argentina
American expatriate basketball people in Mexico
American expatriate basketball people in North Macedonia
American expatriate basketball people in the Dominican Republic
American expatriate basketball people in the United Kingdom
American men's basketball players
Basketball players from Florida
British Basketball League players
Caciques de Humacao players
Competitors at the 2010 Central American and Caribbean Games
Potros ITSON de Obregón players
Puerto Rican men's basketball players
Shooting guards
Sportspeople from Fort Myers, Florida
UMass Minutemen basketball players
Worcester Wolves players
American sportspeople of Puerto Rican descent